Waterville was a ghost town in Wharton County in the U.S. state of Texas. The former settlement was located along Water Hole Creek not far from the site of Preston, another ghost town. During the American Civil War, the town provided soldiers to the Confederate States Army as well as a Home Guard unit. Waterville had a post office intermittently between 1859 and 1880. Local residents attempted to restart postal service in 1883 but it was permanently stopped the following year.

History
The settlement of Waterville sprang up along Water Hole Creek near a place called Will's Water Hole. In January 1859 a post office was set up in the community. Waterville was near Preston in southeast Wharton County. The town was situated along a major trail from Matagorda on the Gulf of Mexico and San Felipe on the Brazos River.

In the Civil War, Waterville raised a company of soldiers for the Confederate Army called the "Rough and Ready Mounted Rifles" under Captain C. F. Whittington. In 1861 there were 27 men enrolled but the number expanded to 39 the following year. In 1862 the town was the headquarters for Colonel Reuben R. Brown's 33rd Texas Cavalry Regiment. Waterville's Home Guard unit numbered 49 men in 1862 but 18 of the men had no firearms. The available weapons were a motley collection of nine rifles, 12 shotguns and five pistols. Postal service was discontinued in 1867, restarted in 1872 and stopped again in 1880. In 1883 a new application was submitted for postal service. Evidently there were too few residents because in August 1884 postal service was stopped and never revived.

Geography
The 1883 postal application located Waterville on a direct line between Wharton and Pledger. Five-ninths of the distance along a straight line drawn on a map between Wharton and Pledger places Waterville very close to Farm to Market Road 1096 and Water Hole Creek. There are turf farms nearby.

References

Ghost towns in South Texas